The Woman's Club of Topeka was named as an entity in 1916 but has earlier roots.  Its building, located just one-half block west of the Kansas State Capitol and completed in 1925, was listed on the National Register of Historic Places in 1982.

A federation of women's clubs in Topeka and its area was formed in 1897, and became the Topeka Federation of Women in 1912.  It "promoted other forms of musical education and entertainment", donated pictures and statues to local schools, donated books and magazines to various institutions, and sought to introduce domestic science and manual arts training into public schools' curricula.

In 1903 after a flood (the Heppner flood of 1903 in Oregon?), the club raised funds for disaster relief.  During World War I it supported the war effort in various ways.

The Woman's Club Building, also known as The Clubhouse of the Woman's Club of Topeka, at 420 W. 9th St. in Topeka, Kansas was built during 1923–25.

See also
Topeka Council of Colored Women's Clubs Building, also NRHP-listed

References

Women's club buildings
National Register of Historic Places in Shawnee County, Kansas
Buildings and structures completed in 1924
History of women in Kansas
Topeka, Kansas